The pied plover (Vanellus cayanus), also known as the pied lapwing, is a species of bird in the family Charadriidae. It is a bird of least concern according to the IUCN and can be found in northern South America. The species name cayanus refers to Cayenne, the capital of French Guiana, where the pied plover can be found.

There is confusion around its common name. Historically, the pied plover was considered to be a plover, which is a bird part of the subfamily  Charadriinae. Most recently, it has been moved to the subfamily Vanellinae, which are the lapwings. The pied plover is still referred to as a plover because it physically resembles that group of birds in shape and size. However, based on taxonomy, it is more correct to refer to it as a lapwing.

Description 
The pied plover is a strongly marked bird with a black and white pattern, buff on its back and wings, and white on its abdomen. Its eyes are encircled with bright red eye-rings. It has a prominent black V on its upper back and has long, red legs. It is a medium-sized bird like most of the species in the family Charadriidae, measuring around 22 centimeters.

There is no sexual dimorphism in this species; both males and females look the same. Juveniles look similar, with the exception of them being more buff and the presence of buff eye-rings instead of red ones.

Taxonomy 
The pied plover belongs to the order Charadriiformes known as the shorebirds. It is within the family Charadriidae and in the genus Vanellus. It is closely related to the genus Charadrius – the typical plovers.

The taxonomy within the family Charadriidae is still disputed and there have been many debates on the pied plover’s classification. The confusion comes from its plover-like appearance compared to other lapwings in the Vanellus genus. 

The pied plover was originally placed in the genus Charadrius with the plovers. It was then hypothesized to be the only species in the genus Vanellus. Later on, the pied plover was placed in the genus Hoploxypterus all alone, with 23 species in the genus Vanellus. Currently, the accepted classification of the pied plover is within the genus Vanellus, along with two other species from South America as well as other species in Eurasia and Africa.

Habitat and distribution
Pied plovers live along the shores of lakes and rivers where there is sand and mud. They reside in the northern part of South America with their range covering Brazil, Bolivia, Paraguay, Peru, Colombia, Ecuador, Venezuela, Guyana, Suriname, and French Guiana.

Not much is known about its movements, but the pied plover seems to change habitat during different parts of the year. It has been observed to move as high as 2600 meters in altitude in Bolivia, possibly due to the wet season pushing it to higher ground.

Behavior 
Little is known about the pied plover’s behavior. Conflicting behavior has been reported. At Serra da Capivara National Park in Brazil, they have been observed to flock only with members of their own species, not mixing with other waders along the shores. However, pied plovers at Tambopata Reserve in Peru were seen alone or in pairs, not flocking together.

Vocalizations 
Pied plovers are a quiet species, not calling very often. Their call sounds like “kee-oo”, with the second part lower in pitch. When flying during their display, their call resembles repeated “klee” sounds.

Diet 
Not much is known about their diet. They mainly eat insects and snails but have been seen holding on to a crustacean with their bill, though it is unclear if they eat them. Notable prey for the pied plover are scorpions, which was documented in Brazil.

Reproduction 
Their displays consist of them flying in the air in an undulatory pattern as they call. While on the ground, they stand facing each other with their wings spread. Generally, pied plovers mate between May and July and lay their eggs in July, though this varies by region.

Pied plovers nest on the ground, digging a shallow hole. The nest is unlined and their eggs are directly touching the ground. When they leave the nest, they cover the eggs with sand for protection.

External links 
Species account - Cornell Lab of Ornithology

Flight call

Call on shore

Collection of drawings and images

References

Vanellus
Birds described in 1790
Taxonomy articles created by Polbot
Taxobox binomials not recognized by IUCN
Taxa named by John Latham (ornithologist)